Brill (meaning hunt hill) is a village in south-west Cornwall, England, UK.

References

Villages in Cornwall